Super Rugby AU, formerly named the Harvey Norman Super Rugby AU for sponsorship purposes, was a rugby union competition organised by Rugby Australia. The competition was created to supplant the 2020 Super Rugby season, which had been suspended in March due to the COVID-19 pandemic. Due to ongoing international travel restrictions relating to the pandemic, the competition was continued with a second season in 2021. The competition features the four Australian Super Rugby teams from the Australian conference, with the addition of the Western Force, in a round-robin tournament over a 12-week period, made up of 10 rounds, a qualifying final and a final.

The competition was announced on 12 May, with the first round commencing on 3 July, making it the third sport to return in Australia (behind AFL and NRL) and just the second rugby union competition to return. Initially, all games were played behind-closed-doors, with restrictions on crowds being eased over time.

Media coverage

Television
During the 2020 season all matches were televised live by affiliate partners Fox Sports. Following Rugby Australia's broadcast deal with Nine Network, all games will be broadcast on streaming service Stan, with one game a round being simulcast on Nine's flagship free to air channel.

Broadcasters

Super Rugby AU is shown by the following broadcasters:

Corporate relations

Sponsorship
The 2020 tournament was run by Rugby Australia with the sponsorship of Foxtel which provided television coverage on its Fox Sports channels with Vodafone (Australia) being the naming rights sponsor. Gilbert is the official supplier of all rugby balls. Ahead of the 2021 season, Foxtel and Vodafone ended their sponsorship agreements, with Nine Network and Stan Sports providing the television coverage. Ahead of the start of the 2021 season, Rugby Australia announced a naming right sponsorship deal with retail company Harvey Norman.

Merchandising
Official match day attire together with other club merchandise is sold through the team’s stores and websites as well through most retailers.

See also

Super Rugby
Super Rugby Trans-Tasman
Super Rugby Aotearoa
Super Rugby Unlocked

References

External links
 

 
 
 
Rugby union competitions for provincial teams
Recurring sporting events established in 2020
2020 establishments in Australia
Sports leagues established in 2020
Professional sports leagues in Australia